Dharmasiri Weerakoon (28 September 1938 – 31 may 1998) was a Sri Lankan boxer. He held the National Champion title in Sri Lanka from 1956 to 1959. He was also the Asian champion in his weight category and represented Sri Lanka (Ceylon) in the 1960 Rome Summer Olympics. He competed in the men's welterweight event at the 1960 Summer Olympics. At the 1960 Summer Olympics, he lost on points to Des Duguid of Australia.

References

External links
 

1938 births
1998 deaths
Sri Lankan male boxers
Olympic boxers of Sri Lanka
Boxers at the 1960 Summer Olympics
Sportspeople from Colombo
Welterweight boxers